State Road 438 (SR 438) is an east–west state highway in Orange County, Florida. Its western terminus is an interchange with State Road 429 (Western Beltway) in Ocoee and it runs east to Rio Grande Avenue in Orlando.

A  segment of the road in Ocoee is also officially designated State Road 437 (SR 437). A former segment of this state road is now designated County Road 437 (CR 437).

Route description
SR 438 officially begins in Winter Garden at an interchange with SR 429 (Western Expressway). The road formerly continued west, but this is not signed and the mileage has been removed from FDOT databases. 

At Ocoee Apopka Road and HM Bowness Road, it supports the former northern terminus of SR 439 and the southern terminus SR 437. SR 438 runs concurrent with SR 437 for one block. Then at Silver Star Road, SR 437 ends (with CR 437 continuing north) and SR 438 turns to the east along Silver Star Road. It goes around Starke Lake. Leaving Ocoee, it next enters unincorporated Pine Hills. SR 438 is now six lanes wide. It started to widen east of Clarke Road. At the easternmost point of Pine Hills, it forms a fork at SR 416. SR 438 becomes Princeton Street and took away a lane in each direction. East of Mercy Drive, SR 438 enters Orlando. The next traffic light forms the intersection of John Young Parkway, with the elevation dropping below . Widening to six lanes again, it meets US 441, as it nears Interstate 4 (I-4). After splitting into a one-way pair along Princeton Avenue (eastbound) and Smith Street (westbound). The road's official eastern terminus is just west of Rio Grande Avenue.

The road becomes a one-way pair as it enters a historic district. Before Interstate 4, it intersects SR 424, a four lane alternate route of US 441. SR 438 is now four lanes wide and meets Interstate 4 as a diamond interchange. As it approaches the Orlando Science Center, it meets SR 527. SR 438 makes three bends to get to its eastern terminus, US 92/US 17 in Orlando.

Major intersections

References

External links

438
438
438